The Seven Year Itch is the first full-length album by Angelica released on Victory Works records. It was produced by Kat Bjelland of Babes in Toyland and Katastrophy Wife who also sang guest vocals on "Golden Lillies".

Track listing
 "I Want A Piece Of The Action"  – 3:32 (Colton)
 "Misdemeanour"  – 2:36 (Colton, Ross)
 "Liberation Is Wasted On Me"  – 3:29 (Ross)
 "Evergreen"  – 4:04 (Ross)
 "Reynard The Fox"  – 3:21 (Angelica)
 "Golden Lillies"  – 0:51 (Colton)
 "The Apple, The Book"  – 3:23 (Colton)
 "Guilty As Sin"  – 2:39 (Colton)
 "Your Religion Is Me"  – 4:18 (Angelica)
 "Rosemary Call The Goddess"  – 3:41 (Angelica)

2002 debut albums
Angelica (band) albums